The 1924 United States Senate election in South Dakota took place on November 4, 1924. Incumbent Senator Thomas Sterling ran for re-election to a third term, but he was defeated in the Republican primary by Governor William H. McMaster. In the general election, McMaster was opposed by attorney Ulysses Simpson Grant Cherry, the Democratic nominee, and several independent candidates. McMaster defeated his opponents by a wide margin, but fell far short of a majority, winning only 44% of the vote.

Democratic Primary

Candidates
 Ulysses Simpson Grant Cherry, Sioux Falls attorney, 1920 Democratic nominee for the U.S. Senate
 Mark P. Bates

Results

Republican Primary

Candidates
 William H. McMaster, former Governor of South Dakota
 Thomas Sterling, incumbent U.S. Senator

Results

Farmer–Labor Primary

Candidates
 Tom Ayres
 Mark P. Bates

Results

General election

Results

References

South Dakota
1924
1924 South Dakota elections